In mathematics, Choi's theorem on completely positive maps is a result that classifies completely positive maps between finite-dimensional (matrix) C*-algebras. An infinite-dimensional algebraic generalization of Choi's theorem is known as Belavkin's "Radon–Nikodym" theorem for completely positive maps.

Statement 
Choi's theorem. Let  be a linear map. The following are equivalent:
(i)  is -positive (i.e.  is positive whenever  is positive).
(ii) The matrix with operator entries

is positive, where  is the matrix with 1 in the -th entry and 0s elsewhere.
(iii)  is completely positive.

Proof

(i) implies (ii)
We observe that if

then E=E* and E2=nE, so E=n−1EE* which is positive. Therefore CΦ =(In ⊗ Φ)(E) is positive by the n-positivity of Φ.

(iii) implies (i)
This holds trivially.

(ii) implies (iii)
This mainly involves chasing the different ways of looking at Cnm×nm:

Let the eigenvector decomposition of CΦ be

where the vectors  lie in Cnm . By assumption, each eigenvalue  is non-negative so we can absorb the eigenvalues in the eigenvectors and redefine  so that

The vector space Cnm can be viewed as the direct sum  compatibly with the above identification 
and the standard basis of Cn.

If Pk ∈ Cm × nm is projection onto the k-th copy of Cm, then Pk* ∈ Cnm×m is the inclusion of Cm as the k-th summand of the direct sum and

Now if the operators Vi ∈ Cm×n are defined on the k-th standard
basis vector ek of Cn by

then

Extending by linearity gives us

for any A ∈ Cn×n. Any map of this form is manifestly completely positive: the map  is completely positive, and the sum (across ) of completely positive operators is again completely positive. Thus  is completely positive, the desired result.

The above is essentially Choi's original proof. Alternative proofs have also been known.

Consequences

Kraus operators 
In the context of quantum information theory, the operators {Vi} are called the Kraus operators (after Karl Kraus) of Φ. Notice, given a completely positive Φ, its Kraus operators need not be unique. For example, any "square root" factorization of the Choi matrix  gives a set of Kraus operators.

Let

where bi*'s are the row vectors of B, then

The corresponding Kraus operators can be obtained by exactly the same argument from the proof.

When the Kraus operators are obtained from the eigenvector decomposition of the Choi matrix, because the eigenvectors form an orthogonal set, the corresponding Kraus operators are also orthogonal in the Hilbert–Schmidt inner product. This is not true in general for Kraus operators obtained from square root factorizations. (Positive semidefinite matrices do not generally have a unique square-root factorizations.)

If two sets of Kraus operators {Ai}1nm and {Bi}1nm represent the same completely positive map Φ, then there exists a unitary operator matrix

This can be viewed as a special case of the result relating two minimal Stinespring representations.

Alternatively, there is an isometry scalar matrix {uij}ij ∈ Cnm × nm such that

This follows from the fact that for two square matrices M and N, M M* = N N* if and only if M = N U for some unitary U.

Completely copositive maps 

It follows immediately from Choi's theorem that Φ is completely copositive if and only if it is of the form

Hermitian-preserving maps 
Choi's technique can be used to obtain a similar result for a more general class of maps. Φ is said to be Hermitian-preserving if A is Hermitian implies Φ(A) is also Hermitian. One can show Φ is Hermitian-preserving if and only if it is of the form

where λi are real numbers, the eigenvalues of CΦ, and each Vi corresponds to an eigenvector of CΦ. Unlike the completely positive case, CΦ may fail to be positive. Since Hermitian matrices do not admit factorizations of the form B*B in general, the Kraus representation is no longer possible for a given Φ.

See also 
Stinespring factorization theorem
Quantum operation
Holevo's theorem

References 

 M.-D. Choi, Completely Positive Linear Maps on Complex Matrices, Linear Algebra and its Applications, 10, 285–290 (1975).
 V. P. Belavkin, P. Staszewski, Radon-Nikodym Theorem for Completely Positive Maps, Reports on Mathematical Physics, v.24, No 1, 49–55 (1986).
 J. de Pillis, Linear Transformations Which Preserve Hermitian and Positive Semidefinite Operators, Pacific Journal of Mathematics, 23, 129–137 (1967).

Linear algebra
Operator theory
Articles containing proofs
Theorems in functional analysis